Creston Park is a  public park in southeast Portland, Oregon's Creston-Kenilworth neighborhood, in the United States. The space was acquired in 1920.

References

External links

 

1920 establishments in Oregon
Creston-Kenilworth, Portland, Oregon
Protected areas established in 1920